The Société Jersiaise is a learned society in Jersey which was founded in 1873, in the manner of similar county societies in the United Kingdom and Sociétés Savantes in France for the purposes of:

"The Publication of Local History,The encouragement of the use of French, the official language,The study of the ancient local dialect,To achieve, as far as possible, the conservation of all prehistoric and historical sites,To found a library, mainly historical and archaeological,To collaborate with other societies with similar aims" 

The Société continues to fulfill these objectives, with two important differences – because it can no longer be said that French is the official language, the encouragement of its use has been dropped and, secondly, an important addition to the aims is the study of all branches of the natural history of the island and publication of the results of fieldwork in these subjects. By 1878 a museum had been formed. In 1893 the Société moved to No. 9 Pier Rd, which continues to house the museum. The Société is a registered charity funded through subscriptions, donations and legacies.

History
On 28 January 1873 a meeting of notables of the island took place to discuss the formation of a society for the preservation of the island's archaeological, historical and linguistic heritage, perceived to be threatened by the expansion of St Helier and coastal development. Those present were aware of the foundation of similar societies in mainland Normandy, such as Société des Antiquaires de Normandie (founded 1824) and similar county societies in the United Kingdom. In 1893 the Société was given a large townhouse in Saint Helier which became the base for its operations including its library and museum. In 1913 the various branches of activity were formalised into 'sections', amongst the first being Archaeology and History. The Section structure still exists and now comprise some 15 sections.

From its inception the Société engaged in archaeological work at numerous sites around the island; most importantly beginning work at La Cotte de St Brelade in 1905, a Neanderthal site of international importance. In 1919 the Société purchased the important Neolithic site of La Hougue Bie, excavating it in 1924 revealing a Neolithic chambered passage grave c.4000BC. The site was then restored and opened as a museum. The Sociéte flourished throughout the 20th century, notwithstanding the difficult years of the German military occupation of the Channel Islands between 1940–1945. Despite the severe hardships and lack of resources suffered by the island, the museum at Pier Rd remained open throughout the Occupation, but despite protestations La Hougue Bie museum was requisitioned for military purposes by the Nazi occupiers.

Post-war the Société continued to grow and add to its collections to the extent that during the 1970s a new headquarters was built adjoining the Pier Road Museum. In 1987 the Société entered into an agreement with the States of Jersey for its museums to be run by the Jersey Heritage Trust, whilst retaining ownership of its collections. This enabled the Société to concentrate on its core activities of research and publication. In 1990 the Société also entered into a working partnership with the National Trust for Jersey which its members had helped to found in 1937, to develop a country life museum at Hamptonne, St Lawrence, a late medieval farm with manorial pretensions, the National Trust purchasing the property, the Société financing the restoration. Presently, the Société has approximately 2,000 members.

Library
The Société library contains much unique and important material about Jersey and comparative academic literature in the form of published works and manuscript documents including maps. The Société employs a professional librarian.

Photographic archive
The Société Jersiaise Photographic Archive contains, as a result of the foresight of early members, by far the most important collection of historic photographic images of the island. A professional photographic archivist is employed by the Société to manage the collection of approximately 100,000 images dating from the mid-1840s to the present day.

Museum collections
Now curated by Jersey Heritage the Société's extensive museum collections contain items on all aspects of Jersey life, in particular Jersey's archaeological heritage. This remains the only substantial collection of Jersey material and is continually expanded by purchase and donation of new pieces, most recently (as of August 2012) a complete Neolithic jadeite ring (anneau-disque) which had been discovered in Jersey in the late 1980s but sold by the finder to a private collector in the USA.

Publications
Much of the work of the Société is published in its Bulletin Annuel commenced in 1875. In addition, the Société has published many works of its members and other scholars. In its early years the Société published many primary sources, such as the Cartulaire des Îles and Actes des États de Jersey to enable its members and others to carry out primary research. Latterly, it has published many secondary works produced by its members and other scholars, many of which remain in print.

The Bulletin'' has been digitised and is available to view on their website.

Current sections

 Archaeology
 Bibliography
 Botany
 Entomology
 Environment
 Garden History

 Geology
 History
 La Langue Jèrriaise
 Marine Biology
 Meteorology

 Mycology
 Numismatics
 Ornithology
 Photography
 Zoology

Notable members
Notable members have included Dr Robert Ranulph Marett, the leading early evolutionary anthropologist, whose father Robert Pipon Marett was a founder member; Dr Arthur Mourant FRS a noted haematologist and George Reginald Balleine historian and clergyman. Geraint Jennings, writer and politician, is also a member.

See also

 Archaeology of the Channel Islands
 Guernsey Society
 Jersey Heritage
 Jersey Society in London

References

External links 

Société Jersiaise Website

Jersey culture
Political advocacy groups in Jersey
Clubs and societies in Jersey
1873 establishments in Jersey
Learned societies of Jersey
Archaeological organizations
Text publication societies
Organizations established in 1873